Mary Elise Sarotte is a post-Cold War historian. She is the Marie-Josée and Henry R. Kravis Distinguished Professor of Historical Studies at the Henry A. Kissinger Center for Global Affairs, which is part of Johns Hopkins University.

Sarotte earned an AB in history and science from Harvard University, and a PhD in history at Yale University. Her book, Not One Inch, was shortlisted for the 2022 Cundill Prize.

Bibliography

 
 
 
 1989: The Struggle to Create Post-Cold War Europe (Second Edition). Princeton: Princeton University Press, 2014. ISBN .
 Collapse: The Accidental Opening of the Berlin Wall. New York: Basic Books, 2014 
 German Reunification: A Multinational History, eds. Frédéric Bozo, Andreas Rödder, and Mary Elise Sarotte (New York: Routledge, 2017)
 Not One Inch: America, Russia, and the Making of Post-Cold War Stalemate. Yale University Press, 2021.

References

External links
Biography at the Center for European Studies Harvard
Youtube- Politics&Prose

Living people
Cold War historians
21st-century American historians
Year of birth missing (living people)
Johns Hopkins University people
Harvard College alumni
Yale University alumni
American women historians